

Alfons Hitter (4 June 1892, Hochstatt, Alsace-Lorraine  – 11 March 1968) was a German general during World War II who commanded the 206th Infantry Division. He was a recipient of the  Knight's Cross of the Iron Cross with Oak Leaves of Nazi Germany.

Hitter surrendered to Soviet forces during Operation Bagration when his division was encircled at Vitebsk. Convicted as a war criminal in the Soviet Union, he was held in prison for eleven years, joining the National Committee for a Free Germany while in captivity.  He was released in 1955.

Awards and decorations
 Iron Cross (1914) 2nd Class (2 September 1914) & 1st Class (5 February 1916)
 Clasp to the Iron Cross (1939) 2nd Class (13 May 1940) & 1st Class  (2 July 1940)
 German Cross in Gold on 15 December 1943 as Generalleutnant and commander of 206. Infanterie-Division
 Knight's Cross of the Iron Cross with Oak Leaves
 Knight's Cross on 14 December 1941 as Oberst and commander of Artillerie-Regiment 178
 488th Oak Leaves on 4 June 1944 as Generalleutnant and commander of 206. Infanterie-Division

References

Citations

Bibliography

 
 
 

1892 births
1968 deaths
People from Haut-Rhin
People from Alsace-Lorraine
Lieutenant generals of the German Army (Wehrmacht)
German Army personnel of World War I
National Committee for a Free Germany members
Recipients of the clasp to the Iron Cross, 1st class
Recipients of the Gold German Cross
Recipients of the Knight's Cross of the Iron Cross with Oak Leaves
German prisoners of war in World War II held by the Soviet Union
Reichswehr personnel
Prussian Army personnel